The 1915 Buffalo Blues season was a season in American baseball. The team, which did not have an official nickname but was generally known as the Buffeds the previous year, adopted the "Blues" nickname for the 1915 season. They finished 74–78, good for 6th place in the Federal League, 12 games behind the Chicago Whales. After the season, both the team and the league folded. It would be 105 more years—when the Toronto Blue Jays temporarily moved to Buffalo to play the pandemic-shortened 2020 season and avoid border restrictions—before Buffalo hosted Major League Baseball again.

Regular season

Season standings

Record vs. opponents

Roster

Player stats

Batting

Starters by position 
Note: Pos = Position; G = Games played; AB = At bats; H = Hits; Avg. = Batting average; HR = Home runs; RBI = Runs batted in

Other batters 
Note: G = Games played; AB = At bats; H = Hits; Avg. = Batting average; HR = Home runs; RBI = Runs batted in

Pitching

Starting pitchers 
Note: G = Games pitched; IP = Innings pitched; W = Wins; L = Losses; ERA = Earned run average; SO = Strikeouts

Other pitchers 
Note: G = Games pitched; IP = Innings pitched; W = Wins; L = Losses; ERA = Earned run average; SO = Strikeouts

Relief pitchers 
Note: G = Games pitched; W = Wins; L = Losses; SV = Saves; ERA = Earned run average; SO = Strikeouts

References 
1915 Buffalo Blues at Baseball Reference

Buffalo Blues season
Buffalo Blues seasons
1915 in sports in New York (state)